Mare Labedens is a former French slalom canoeist who competed from the late 1970s to the early 1980s. He won a silver medal in the C-2 team event at the 1979 ICF Canoe Slalom World Championships in Jonquière.

References

External links 
 Mare LABEDENS at CanoeSlalom.net

French male canoeists
Living people
Year of birth missing (living people)
Medalists at the ICF Canoe Slalom World Championships
20th-century French people